Vurun Kahpeye is a 1973 Turkish drama film, directed by Halit Refiğ and starring Hale Soygazi, Tugay Toksöz, and Tanju Gürsu.

References

External links

1973 films
Turkish drama films
1973 drama films
Films directed by Halit Refiğ